The 180 MW "Tatanka Wind Farm", is located in Dickey County and McIntosh County, North Dakota, and McPherson County, South Dakota. It is the largest wind farm in North and South Dakota and generates enough renewable energy to power more than 60,000 U.S. homes. 

Tatanka Wind Farm is the first installation of Acciona's 1.5 MW wind turbines in the United States. Construction of the $381 million project began in April 2007.  The plant went online on July 25, 2008.

See also

List of wind farms

References

Energy infrastructure completed in 2008
Buildings and structures in Dickey County, North Dakota
Buildings and structures in McIntosh County, North Dakota
Buildings and structures in McPherson County, South Dakota
Wind farms in North Dakota
Wind farms in South Dakota